The Army Staff, in the meaning of the Army general staff, of the German Army was a department of the Federal Ministry of Defence and one of the five staff headquarters in the military command of the Bundeswehr. The Army Staff was thus at the same time a ministerial division and the highest level of military command within the German Army. It was merged with the other high command authorities of the German Army to form the Army Command (Kommando Heer) in 2012.

In 2012, there existed in MOD Germany supreme military command authority as follows:
Armed Forces Staff (Führungsstab der Streitkräfte – Fü S; General Staff of the Armed Forces)
Army Staff (Führungsstab des Heeres – Fü H; Army General Staff)
Air Force Staff (Führungsstab der Luftwaffe – Fü L; Air Force General Staff)
Navy Staff (Führungsstab der Marine – Fü M)
Medical Staff (Führungsstab des Sanitätsdienstes – Fü San; Medical Service Staff)

Command 
The Army Staff was commanded by the Inspector of the Army (Inspekteur des Heeres). The Inspector holds the rank of Generalleutnant, and commanded the Army Staff, reporting to the Federal Minister of Defence. The General Inspector of the Bundeswehr and the Armed Forces Staff who work for him are only authorised to issue directives to the Army Staff in the fields of development and the realisation of the overall concept for the Bundeswehr. The Army Staff comprised about 180 soldiers and civil servants.

Mission 
The Army Staff was the highest level of command in the German Army. The staff ensured the readiness of the Army from a materiel and personnel perspective. In addition the two command pillars of the Army, the Army Forces Command and the Army Office, were subordinate to the Army Staff. Furthermore, the staff supported the Inspector of the Army and the Federal Minister of Defence in their ministerial duties.

Deputy Inspector General of the Army 
The Deputy Inspector General of the Army (in the Army Staff of MOD Germany) appointment was normally assigned to a three star rank, OF8-general (Generalleutnant / lieutenant general) rank.

External links 
Federal archive on its history
Website of the Army Staff

German Army (1956–present)
Bundeswehr
Staff (military)
Military units and formations established in 1957
Military units and formations disestablished in 2012